Ricketts House, also known as the Stevens Residence, is a historic home located at Huntington, Cabell County, West Virginia. It was designed in 1924, and built in 1925.  It is a large (c. 16,000 square feet) stone dwelling with a complex, low pitched hipped roof punctuated by four large stone chimneys and with large overhanging eaves. The design is reflective of the Prairie School, with Tudor manor house influences. It is a significant and well-preserved work of the prominent Huntington architect, Levi J. Dean.

It was listed on the National Register of Historic Places in 1994.

References

Houses completed in 1925
Houses in Huntington, West Virginia
Houses on the National Register of Historic Places in West Virginia
National Register of Historic Places in Cabell County, West Virginia
Prairie School architecture in West Virginia
Stone houses in West Virginia
Tudor Revival architecture in West Virginia